Sagotylus is a genus of leaf-footed bugs in the family Coreidae, containing one described species, S. confluens.

References

Further reading

 

Articles created by Qbugbot
Acanthocerini
Monotypic Hemiptera genera
Coreidae genera